The 2018 Limerick Senior Hurling Championship was the 124th staging of the Limerick Senior Hurling Championship since its establishment by the Limerick County Board in 1887. The group stage placings were confirmed on 21 November 2017. The championship began on 20 April 2018 and ended on 27 October 2018.

Na Piarsaigh were the defending champions.

On 27 October 2018, Na Piarsaigh won the title following a 2-22 to 3-10 defeat of Doon in the final at the Gaelic Grounds. It was their fifth championship title overall and their second title in succession.	

Na Piarsaigh's Shane Dowling was the championship's top scorer with 1-65.

Results

Group 1

Table

Results

Group 2

Table

Results

Knock-out stage

Quarter-finals

Semi-finals

Final

External links

 Limerick GAA website

References

Limerick Senior Hurling Championship
Limerick